S21 Guanghui Expressway is a route that connects the cities of Guangzhou and Huizhou in the Chinese province of Guangdong.

Expressways in China
Transport in Guangdong